Dieugot Joseph (born March 21, 1994) is a former American football offensive tackle. He played college football at FIU, and signed with the Chicago Bears as an undrafted free agent in 2017.

High school and college career
Joseph played high school football at Freedom High School (Orlando, Florida) in Orlando, Florida. Joseph played both football and basketball while at high school and committed to Florida International University Panthers on December 11, 2011.

Joseph redshirted his freshman year in 2012. As a sophomore, Joseph appeared in all 12 games and started in eight of them. In 2013, Joseph was a member of an offensive line that gained 4,173 yards of offense (fifth-most in school history).

In his senior year, Joseph was an All-C-USA Honorable Mention selection. He was also named as a game captain in their game against Maryland. Joseph started in all 12 games on an offensive line that helped produce 4,503 yards of total offense (No. 4 all-time for yards in a season at FIU).

Professional career

Chicago Bears
Joseph signed with the Chicago Bears as an undrafted free agent on May 11, 2017. He was waived on September 2, 2017 and was signed to the practice squad the next day.

Baltimore Ravens
On September 19, 2017, Joseph was signed by the Baltimore Ravens off the Bears' practice squad. He was waived by the Ravens on October 10, 2017 and was signed to the practice squad the next day.

Minnesota Vikings
On January 9, 2018, Joseph was signed to the Minnesota Vikings' practice squad. He signed a reserve/future contract with the Vikings on January 22, 2018. He was waived on August 31, 2018.

New York Jets
On September 3, 2018, Joseph was signed to the New York Jets' practice squad. He was released on October 8, 2018, but was re-signed nine days later. He signed a reserve/future contract with the Jets on December 31, 2018. He was waived on May 14, 2019.

Atlanta Falcons
On May 29, 2019, Joseph signed with the Atlanta Falcons. He was waived on August 27, 2019 with an injury settlement.

Philadelphia Eagles
On January 1, 2020, Joseph was signed to the Philadelphia Eagles practice squad. His practice squad contract with the team expired on January 13, 2020.

Joseph had a tryout with the Dallas Cowboys on August 17, 2020, and with the Washington Football Team on August 19, 2020.

Personal life
Joseph is of Haitian descent.

References

External links
FIU Panthers bio

1994 births
Living people
Atlanta Falcons players
Baltimore Ravens players
Chicago Bears players
FIU Panthers football players
Minnesota Vikings players
New York Jets players
Philadelphia Eagles players
Players of American football from Orlando, Florida
American sportspeople of Haitian descent